This is a list of airlines currently operating in Rwanda.

See also
 List of airlines
 List of defunct airlines of Rwanda

Rwanda
Airlines
Airlines
Rwanda